An N95 is a particulate-filtering respirator.

N95 may also refer to:
 N95 (Long Island bus)
 "N95" (song), by Kendrick Lamar, 2022
 , a submarine of the Royal Navy
 N-95 National Highway, in Pakistan
 Nebraska Highway 95, in the United States
 Nokia N95, a smartphone